Selnes may refer to

Places
 Selnes, Iceland, a place in Austurland, Iceland
 Selnes, Trøndelag, a village in Åfjord municipality in Trøndelag county, Norway

Ships
, a Norwegian cargo ship in service 1946-50